Cefu Yuangui (冊府元龜) is the largest leishu (encyclopedia) compiled during the Chinese Song Dynasty (AD 960–1279). It was the last of the Four Great Books of Song, the previous three having been published in the 10th century.

History

The encyclopedia was commissioned by Emperor Zhenzong in October 1005 under the working title Records of Relations Between Rulers and Officials in Past Dynasties but was renamed Models from the Archives by the Emperor, to whom the finished work was presented on September 20, 1013.  The final product was divided into 1,000 juan, 31 categories, and 1014 subcategories, all of which "related to administration of the empire, to bureaucracy, and to the imperial family." It did not include chapters on the natural world.  Many people worked on the encyclopedia, including Wang Qinruo and Yang Yi who requested that the emperor hire more compilers. It was almost twice as large as the Imperial Reader of the Taiping Era and was ranked second in the Siku Quanshu collections.

Name

English titles for this encyclopedia are:
 Prime Tortoise of the Record Bureau,
 The Magic Mirror in the Palace of Books,
 Archival Palace as the Great Oracle,
 General Preface on Outer Ministers,
 Outstanding Models from the Storehouse of Literature, and
 Models from the Archives.

See also
 Chinese literature
 Chinese classic texts
 Culture of the Song Dynasty

References

Citations

Bibliography
Hu, Wenjie, Cefu Yuangui ("Prime Tortoise of the Record Bureau"). Encyclopedia of China, 1st ed.
Kurz, Johannes. "The Compilation and Publication of the Taiping Yulan and the Cefu Yuangui", in Florence Bretelle-Establet and Karine Chemla (eds.), Qu'est-ce qu'écrire une encyclopédie en Chine?. Extreme Orient-Extreme Occident Hors série (2007), 39–76.

External links
 Cefu yuangui "The Prime Tortoise of the Record Bureau" — Chinaknowledge.de.

Chinese prose texts
Chinese encyclopedias
Chinese literature
11th-century Chinese books
Song dynasty literature

Leishu